Keele is a village in Staffordshire, England.

Keele may also refer to:

Britain
 Keele (ward), a local council ward in the borough of Newcastle-under-Lyme
 Keele University

Canada
Keele Street, Toronto
 Keele station, a Toronto subway station  
 Keelesdale station, an under-construction Toronto subway station
 Keele River, a tributary of the Mackenzie River

People
 Thomas Keele (disambiguation)

See also

Keal (disambiguation)
Keel (disambiguation)
Kiel (disambiguation)
Kil (disambiguation)
Kile (disambiguation)
Kill (disambiguation)
Kyl (disambiguation)
Kyle (disambiguation)
Kyll